Claire-Louise Bennett is a British writer, living in Galway in Ireland. She has written Pond (2015), which was shortlisted for the Dylan Thomas Prize; and Checkout 19 (2021), which was shortlisted for the Goldsmiths Prize.

Biography
Bennett grew up in a working-class family in Wiltshire. She studied literature and drama at the University of Roehampton in London. She emigrated from the UK to Galway in Ireland around the turn of the millennium.

Publications
Pond. Hardback; Stinging Fly, 2015; . Paperback; Fitzcarraldo, 2015; .
Checkout 19. Jonathan Cape, 2021. .
 Fish out of water

Awards
2013: Winner, The White Review Short Story Prize for "The Lady of the House"
2016: Shortlisted, Dylan Thomas Prize for Pond
2021: Shortlisted, Goldsmiths Prize for Checkout 19

References

Living people
21st-century English women writers
21st-century English writers
Alumni of the University of Roehampton
The New Yorker people
People from Wiltshire
Place of birth missing (living people)
Year of birth missing (living people)